Sven Coomer (born 12 October 1940) is an Australian modern pentathlete. He competed at the 1956 Summer Olympics.

Coomer went on to study product design in Sweden, where he learned to ski and ski-race. He later worked as a ski racing coach, ski instructor and ski school director in the United States. That career led to a job designing ski boots for the Italian firm Nordica, and his designs were widely imitated by other factories.

References

1940 births
Living people
Australian male modern pentathletes
Olympic modern pentathletes of Australia
Modern pentathletes at the 1956 Summer Olympics
Sportspeople from Sydney